was a Japanese businessman, central banker, the 21st Governor of the Bank of Japan (BOJ).

Early life
Usami was born in Yamagata.

Career
Usami was Governor of the Bank of Japan from December 17, 1964 to December 16, 1969,  During Usami's tenure, the Bank was concerned with ensuring the stability of the Japanese yen in relation to other currencies.

Notes

References
 Werner, Richard A. (2003). Princes of the Yen: Japan's Central Bankers and the Transformation of the Economy. Armonk, New York: M.E. Sharpe. ;  OCLC 471605161

Makoto Usami (December 17, 1964 – December 16, 1969)

1901 births
1983 deaths
Governors of the Bank of Japan
People from Yamagata Prefecture